Earias is a genus of moths in the monotypic subfamily Eariadinae of the family Nolidae. The genus was erected by Jacob Hübner in 1825. Species are found throughout Europe, Africa, Asia and Australia, some being agricultural pests such as bollworms.

Description
Palpi upturned and second joint reaching vertex of head. Third joint porrect (extending forward) and varying in length. Antennae minutely ciliated in male. Forewings with veins 3 to 5 from near angle of cell, vein 6 from upper angle, and veins 7 to 9 stalked. Hindwings with veins 3 and 4 stalked, vein 5 absent, veins 6 and 7 from upper angle and vein 8 from center of cell.

Species
Some species of this genus are:

References

Nolidae
Noctuoidea genera